Yang Berbahagia Dato' Jalaluddin bin Hassan (born 18 February 1954) is a Malaysian actor and television host. He is famously known for being the host of the Malaysian version of Who Wants to Be a Millionaire? game show in Malay on NTV7 (2000–2002).

Background 
He is the third child of Haji Hassan Azhari, a religious scholar who had a dedicated programme teaching the Qur'an on Radio Televisyen Malaysia (RTM) from 1960 to 2000. He is related to Musa Hassan, a former Inspector General of Police for the Royal Malaysia Police (RMP), and Fuad Hassan (1949–2014), a former assemblyman of Ulu Klang and Director General of the Special Affairs Department (JASA) in the Ministry of Information. He is a Malay of Banjar descent.

Honours

Honour of Malaysia
  :
  Knight Commander of Grand Order of Tuanku Jaafar (DPTJ) – Dato' (2007)

He was awarded the Darjah Kebesaran Tuanku Jaafar (DPTJ) which carries the title Dato' by the Yang di-Pertua Negeri Sembilan, Tuanku Ja'afar in conjunction with his birthday in year 2007.

Filmography

Film

Television series

Telemovie

Television

Theater

Videography

TV commercials

Music video

References

External links
 

Living people
1954 births
People from Selangor
Malaysian people of Malay descent
People from Kuala Lumpur
Malaysian people of Banjar descent
Malaysian Muslims
Malaysian male actors
Malaysian television personalities
21st-century Malaysian people